This is a list of civil wars and organized civil disorder, revolts, and rebellions in ancient Rome (Roman Kingdom, Roman Republic, and Roman Empire) until the fall of the Western Roman Empire (753 BC – AD 476). For the Eastern Roman Empire or Byzantine Empire after the division of the Empire in West and East, see List of Byzantine revolts and civil wars (AD 330–1453). For external conflicts, see List of Roman wars and battles. 

From the establishment of the Roman Republic in 509 BC until the 1st century BC, there were a sparse number of civil wars. But with the Crisis of the Roman Republic (134–44 BC), a period of considerable political instability began. The cause of the late Roman Republican civil wars is contested, as is whether the wars were the cause of, or caused by, the end of the Roman Republic. Regardless, a nearly constant stream of civil wars marked the end of the Roman Republic and heralded the rise of the Roman Empire in 27 BC. The first century of Empire was marked by widespread revolt through territory Rome had captured in the preceding centuries. The second century CE was relatively peaceful, with a limited number of revolts. Political instability returned to the Empire with the Crisis of the Third Century (235–384 BC), which saw at least 26 civil wars in just 50 years as usurpers sought the imperial throne. The fourth and fifth centuries AD were characterized by a regular rising of usurpers. The overthrow of the last Roman emperor in AD 476 by the Germanic King Odoacer marked the final civil war or revolt, as well as the end of the Roman Empire. 

Because the study of Roman civil war has been deeply influenced by historic Roman views on civil war, not all entries on this list may be considered civil wars by modern historians. Implicit in most Roman power struggles was a propaganda battle, which impacted how the struggle would be chronicled and referred to. For example, historians Lange & Vervaet suggest that the crisis after Caesar's assassination might be better understood as an internal emergency. Conversely, some revolts on this list may be properly considered to be civil wars, but were not referred to as such by Roman chroniclers. As Lange & Vervaet note, "civil war often refuses to speak its name."

3rd century BC
 241 BC: Falisci revolt – revolt suppressed
 216–203 BC: Defection of Rome's Italic allies to the Carthaginians during the Second Punic War

2nd century BC
 135–132 BC: First Servile War in Sicily - revolt suppressed
 125 BC: Fregellae revolt - revolt suppressed
 104–100 BC: Second Servile War in Sicily - revolt suppressed

1st century BC
 91–87 BC: Social War, between Rome and many of its fellow Italian allies - Roman victory.
 88 BC: Sulla's march on Rome, causing his enemy, Gaius Marius, to be outlawed
 87 BC: Bellum Octavianum, civil war between the consuls Cornelius Cinna and Octavius – Cinnan victory.
 83–81 BC: Sulla's civil war, fought between Sulla and Cinna's supporters – Sullan victory.
 80–72 BC: Sertorian War between Rome and the provinces of Hispania under the leadership of Quintus Sertorius, a former supporter of Marius and Cinna – Sullan victory.
 77 BC: Lepidus' rebellion against the Sullan regime – Sullan victory.
 73–71 BC: Third Servile War in Italy – revolt suppressed.
 63–62 BC: Catiline Conspiracy between the Senate and the dissatisfied followers of Catiline – Senatorial victory.
 54–53 BC: Ambiorix's revolt, part of the larger Gallic Wars.
 49–45 BC: Caesar's Civil War between Julius Caesar and the Optimates initially led by Pompey the Great (Gnaeus Pompeius Magnus) – Caesarian victory.
 46 BC: Revolt of the Bellovaci in North-Eastern Gaul – revolt suppressed
 44 BC: Revolt of the Allobroges in Gaul – revolt suppressed
 44–43 BC: Post-Caesarian Civil War between the Senate's army (led first by Cicero and then by Octavian) and the army of Antony, Lepidus, and their colleagues – Truce results in union of forces.
 44–42 BC: Liberators' civil war between the Second Triumvirate and the Liberators (Brutus and Cassius, Caesar's assassins) – Triumvirate victory.
 44–36 BC: Bellum Siculum, war between the Second Triumvirate (particularly Octavian and Agrippa) and Sextus Pompey, the son of Pompey – Triumvirate victory.
 41–40 BC: Perusine War between the forces of Octavian against Lucius Antonius and Fulvia (the younger brother and wife of Mark Antony) – Octavian victory.
 38 BC: Revolt of Aquitanian tribes – revolt suppressed by Marcus Vipsanius Agrippa
 32–30 BC: War of Actium between Octavian and his friend and general Agrippa against Antony and Cleopatra – Octavian victory.
 30–29 BC: Revolt of the Morini and Treveri in Northern Gaul with Germanic support – revolt suppressed
 30 BC: Revolt in the Nile delta and the Thebaid – revolt suppressed by Gaius Cornelius Gallus
 28–27 BC: Revolt in Gallia Aquitania – revolt suppressed by Marcus Valerius Messalla Corvinus
 13 BC: Revolt of Vologases, priest of Dionysus, in Thrace – revolt suppressed
 11–9 BC: Revolt of southern mountain tribes in Thrace – revolt suppressed by Calpurnius Piso
 4 BC: Revolt of Jews in Judea – revolt suppressed by Publius Quinctilius Varus

1st century
 3–6: Revolt of the Gaetuli in Mauretania – revolt suppressed by Cossus Cornelius Lentulus Gaetulicus
 6: Revolt of Judas of Galilee against Roman taxation – revolt suppressed
 6–9: Bellum Batonianum, a great rebellion in Illyricum against Rome – revolt suppressed by Tiberius
 9: Revolt by German leader Arminius destroys three Roman legions in the Battle of the Teutoburg Forest, permanently ending Roman efforts to conquer Germanic territories east of the Rhine. 
 14: Mutiny of the legions in Germania and Illyricum suppressed by Germanicus and Drusus Julius Caesar
 17–24: Tacfarinas' revolt in north Africa – revolt suppressed by Publius Cornelius Dolabella
 21: Revolt of the Treveri, Aedui, Andes (Andecavi) and Turoni under Julius Florus and Julius Sacrovir in Gaul – revolt suppressed by Gaius Silius and Gaius Calpurnius Aviola
 21: Revolt of the Coelaletae, Odrysae and Dii in Thrace – revolt suppressed by P. Vellaeus
 26: Revolt in Thrace – revolt suppressed by Gaius Poppaeus Sabinus
 28: Revolt of the Frisii in the Battle of Baduhenna Wood – rebel victory
 36: Revolt of the Cietae in Cappadocia – revolt suppressed by Marcus Trebellius
 38: Alexandrian riots
 40: Alexandrian riots
 40–44: Revolt of Aedemon and Sabalus in Mauretania – revolt suppressed by Gaius Suetonius Paulinus and Gnaeus Hosidius Geta
 42: Failed usurpation of Lucius Arruntius Camillus Scribonianus in Dalmatia
 46: The Kingdom of Thrace riots against the Romans after the death of King Rhoemetalces III – revolt suppressed
 46–48: Jacob and Simon uprising in the Galilee – revolt suppressed
 60–61: Boudica's uprising in Britain – revolt suppressed by Gaius Suetonius Paulinus
 66–73: First Jewish–Roman War – revolt suppressed
 68: Revolt in Gallia Lugdunensis under Gaius Julius Vindex – revolt suppressed by Lucius Verginius Rufus' army
 68–69: The Year of the Four Emperors between various Romans following the death of Nero (AD 68). After Nero's suicide, the generals Galba, Otho, and Vitellius take the throne within months of each other. General Vespasian, who until that point was fighting the revolt in Judaea, is victorious. He founds the Flavian dynasty.
 69: Revolt of Anicetus in Colchis – revolt suppressed by Virdius Geminus
 69–70: Revolt of the Batavi, Treveri and Lingones in Gaul – revolt suppressed
 79–80: Failed usurpation of Terentius Maximus, a Pseudo-Nero, in Asia
 89: Revolt of Lucius Antonius Saturninus with two legions in Germania Superior – revolt suppressed

2nd century
 115–117: Revolt in Arkis ilgeria  rebels victory But the Romans recaptured Arkis in 5 days
 117: Revolt of the ilgerians in the Port of Sambicus 469 Roman Soldiers Death
 122: Battle of Tofos  Ilgerians victory
 132–136:  Fioros first revolt in Ilgeria-Fioros first victory
 152: Revolt of the ilgerians
 153: Revolt of the ilgerians
 172: Revolt of the zuzia in Ilgeria – revolt suppressed in 48 day
 175: Failed genocide of Ilgerians
 185: Killing of Didius Julianus in Ilgeria-Tofos

 190: Two revolts in Ilgeria  Roman general Pertinax death
 193–197: Year of the Five Emperors and subsequent civil war between the generals Septimius Severus, Pescennius Niger and Clodius Albinus following the assassination of Commodus (AD 192) and the subsequent murders of Pertinax and Didius Julianus (AD 193). Severus is victorious and founds the Severan dynasty.

3rd century

 218: Battle of Antioch, fought between the Emperor Macrinus and his rival Elagabalus and resulting in Macrinus' downfall and his replacement by Elagabalus.
 219: Failed usurpations of Verus and Gellius Maximus in Syria.
 221: Failed usurpation of Seleucus, possibly in Moesia
 227: Failed usurpation of Seius Sallustius in Rome
 232: Failed usurpation of Taurinius in Syria.
 235–284: Crisis of the Third Century – at least 26 claimants fought with each other to become emperor and emperors fought against usurpers, resulting in frequent civil war and breakaway Gallic Roman (260–274) and Palmyrene Empires (270–273).
 238: Year of the Six Emperors between various generals against Maximinus Thrax and after his murder. After Gordian I and Gordian II are defeated by a pro-Maximinus Army following an attempt to overthrow the emperor, Maximinus is assassinated. Pupienus, Balbinus, and Gordian III replace him, but the former two are assassinated within months and only Gordian III survives.
 240: Failed usurpation of Sabinianus in Mauretania
 248–249: Failed usurpations of Jotapianus in Syria and Pacatianus in Moesia.
 249: Emperor Philip the Arab killed and overthrown by rebels at the Battle of Verona and replaced by Decius.
 250: Failed usurpation of Licinianus in Rome.
 251: Failed usurpation of Titus Julius Priscus in Thrace.
 252: Failed usurpation of Cyriades in Syria.
 253: Usurpations of Aemilianus and Valerian: Emperors Trebonianus Gallus and Volusianus murdered by their soldiers and replaced by Aemilianus. Valerian raises the Rhine legions in revolt, while Aemilianus is killed by his own soldiers.
 254: Failed usurpation of Uranius in Syria.
 260: Failed usurpations of Ingenuus and Regalianus in Pannonia; possibly of Sponsianus in Dacia.
 260–261: Failed usurpation of Macrianus Major, Macrianus Minor, Quietus and Balista in the East
 260–274: The breakaway Gallic Empire
 261: Failed usurpations of Lucius Piso and Valens Thessalonicus in Achaea.
 261–262: Failed usurpation of Mussius Aemilianus and Memor in Egypt.
 267: Failed usurpation of Maeonius in Palmyra.
 268: Failed usurpation of Aureolus in the West. Emperor Gallienus murdered by his soldiers and Claudius Gothicus proclaimed Emperor.
 270: Usurpation of Aurelian against Quintillus.
 270–273: The breakaway Palmyrene Empire.
 271: Failed usurpations of Felicissimus in Rome and Septimius in Dalmatia.
 275: Aurelian murdered by the Praetorian Guard and replaced by Marcus Claudius Tacitus
 276: Usurpation of Probus against Florianus.
 280: Failed usurpation of Julius Saturninus in the East.
 280–281: Failed usurpation of Proculus and Bonosus in the West.
 282: Probus assassinated by his soldiers. The new emperor Carus may have been involved in the plotting.  
 283–285: Failed usurpation of Sabinus Julianus.
 284–285: Usurpation of Diocletian against Carinus
 284–286: Bagaudae uprising in Gaul under Aelianus and Amandus – revolt suppressed
 286–296: Carausian revolt under Carausius and Allectus in Britain and northern Gaul – revolt suppressed
 293: Revolt of the towns of Busiris and Coptos in the Egyptian Thebaid – revolt suppressed by Galerius
 297–298: Failed usurpation of Domitius Domitianus and Achilleus in Egypt

4th century
 303: Failed usurpation of Eugenius in Roman Syria
 306–324: Civil wars of the Tetrarchy, beginning with the usurpation of Maxentius and the defeat of Flavius Valerius Severus, and ending with the defeat of Licinius at the hands of Constantine I in 324 AD. The Tetrarchy established by Diocletian would break up because of these wars. 
 334: Failed usurpation of Calocaerus in Cyprus
 337: Caesars Dalmatius and Hannibalianus killed by soldiers in a purge orchestrated by Constantius II.
 340: Civil war, when Constans defeated Constantine II near Aquileia.
 350–353: Roman civil war of 350–353, when Constantius II defeated the usurper Magnentius who had assassinated Constans.
 351–352: Jewish revolt against Constantius Gallus in Syria Palaestina – revolt suppressed
 355: Failed usurpation of Claudius Silvanus in Gaul
 361: Usurpation of Julian the Apostate
 365–366: Revolt of Procopius, when the Emperor Valens defeated the usurpers Procopius and Marcellus.
 372: Failed usurpation of Theodorus in Antioch
 372–375: Revolt of Firmus in Africa – revolt suppressed by Count Theodosius
 383–384: Usurpation of Magnus Maximus in the west and the killing of Gratian by the general Andragathius
 387: Tax riots against Emperor Theodosius I in Antioch.
 387–388: Civil War of 387–388, when the Eastern Emperor Theodosius I defeated the Western Emperor Magnus Maximus.
 390: Revolt in Thessalonica culminating in the Massacre of Thessalonica.
 392–394: Civil War of 392–394, when the Eastern Emperor Theodosius I defeated the usurper Eugenius.
 398: Gildonic revolt, when the Comes Gildo rebelled against the Western Emperor Honorius. The revolt was subdued by Flavius Stilicho, the magister militum of the Western Roman empire.
 399–400: Revolt of Tribigild and Gainas in the Eastern Empire – revolt suppressed

5th century
 406–413: Civil war as the usurpers Marcus, Gratian, Constantine III, Constans II (son of Constantine III), Maximus of Hispania, Priscus Attalus, Jovinus, Sebastianus and Heraclianus tried to usurp the throne of Emperor Honorius. All were defeated.
 409–417: Bagaudae uprising in the Loire valley and Brittany
 419–421: Revolt of Maximus in Hispania – revolt suppressed
 423–425: Civil war, when the usurper Joannes was defeated by the army of Emperor Valentinian III.
 427–429: Civil war, when the Comes Africae Bonifacius fought inconclusively against the Magister militum Felix. The civil war was terminated by negotiations brokered by Galla Placidia.
 432: Civil war, when the Magister militum Flavius Aetius was defeated by the rival Magister militum Bonifacius, who died of wounds sustained in battle soon afterwards, giving Aetius full control over the Western Empire.
 435–437: Bagaudae uprising under Tibatto in Gaul suppressed by Flavius Aetius.
 455: Valentinian III assassinated and overthrown by Petronius Maximus.
 455: Petronius Maximus stoned to death by mob and replaced by Avitus.
 461: Majorian assassinated and overthrown by Ricimer.
 468: Failed usurpation by Arvandus.
 470: Failed usurpation by Romanus.
 472: Anthemius overthrown by Ricimer.
 474: Glycerius overthrown by Julius Nepos.
 475: Julius Nepos overthrown by Orestes.
 476: Orestes overthrown by Odoacer. Romulus Augustulus deposed, ending the Western Roman Empire.

References 
Footnotes

General
Kohn, George Childs, 'Dictionary of Wars, Revised Edition' (Checkmark Books, New York, 1999)

Civil wars and revolts
Civil wars involving the states and peoples of Europe
Civil wars of antiquity
Civil wars of the Roman Empire
Roman Republican civil wars